Basma Ahmed Sayyed Hassan (born December 7, 1976) is an Egyptian actress.

Early life
Basma's father is a journalist and her mother is a women's rights activist. She is the granddaughter through her mother of the late Youssef Darwish, who was an Egyptian Jew and a communist activist.

Basma studied English literature at the Cairo University.

Career
Basma began her career acting at the university in the film "El Madyna (The City)" where the director Yousry Nasrallah chose her to participate in the film; however, before the movie she tried to be a radio presenter and had already taken an interview in the national radio channel. But before anything, Yousry Nasrallah selected her for the movie "El Madyna (city)". Later on, she acted in the American TV series, Tyrant.

Private life
On 15 February 2012, Basma Hassan married the political activist Amr Hamzawy, who was a Member of Parliament for the Freedom Egypt Party. The couple had a daughter, Nadia, but they separated in 2019.

Filmography
 Rasael Al Bahr (Sea Messages), 2010
 The Traveller, 2009
 Zay El Naharda (Yesterday is a new day), 2008: May
 Morgan Ahmed Morgan, 2007: Alyaa
 Kashf hesab, 2007: Donia
 Le'bet El hobb (Game Of Love), 2006: Hanan
 The Night Baghdad Fell, 2005
 Harim Karim, 2005: Dina
 Men nazret ain (By a Glimpse of an Eye), 2004: Noody
 El Na'amah W El tawus (Ostrich And Peacock), 2002: Samira
 El Nazer, 2000
 El Madyna (City), 1999: Nadia

Awards
 Best actress award at the Motion Picture Association Festival for her role in "Zay El Naharda" (2009)
 Best actress award (Egyptian Cinema Awards) for her role in "Morgan Ahmed Morgan" (2008)
 Best actress award (Egyptian Cinema Awards) for her role in "Game of Love" (2007)
 Best actress award (Egyptian Cinema Awards) for her role in "The Night Baghdad Fell" (2006).
 Award of the "Lights of Safi" festival in Safi, Morocco (2006)
 Best new face and best actress awards in the Arab section of the Alexandria International Film Festival for her role in "Ostrich and Peacock" (2002)

References

Resources

External links 

Egyptian television actresses
Egyptian film actresses
Egyptian Muslims
Egyptian people of Jewish descent
1976 births
Living people
Actresses from Cairo
Cairo University alumni